Sämann is a German surname. Notable people with the surname include:

Gerlinde Sämann (born 1969), German soprano
Julius Sämann (1911–1999), German-Canadian perfumist and chemist

German-language surnames